The 1999 Men's South American Volleyball Championship was the 23rd edition of the event, organised by South America's governing volleyball body, the Confederación Sudamericana de Voleibol (CSV). The final round was hosted in Córdoba, Argentina from September 7 to September 11, 1999. Brazil and hosts Argentina were automatically qualified, Venezuela and Uruguay each won their preliminary round.

Preliminary round robin
Thursday 1999-09-07

Friday 1999-09-08

Saturday 1999-09-09

Final standings

Finals
Sunday 1999-09-11

Final ranking

Individual awards

References
 Results

Men's South American Volleyball Championships
S
Volleyball
V
1999 in South American sport
September 1999 sports events in South America